Dig Deeper may refer to:
Dig Deeper (album), by D.I.G., 1994
Dig Deeper: The Disappearance of Birgit Meier, a 2021 miniseries

See also
Dig Deep (disambiguation)